The Federated States of Micronesia (abbreviated FSM) is an island country in Oceania. It consists of four states—from west to east, Yap, Chuuk, Pohnpei and Kosrae—that are spread across the western Pacific. Together, the states comprise around 607 islands (a combined land area of approximately ) that cover a longitudinal distance of almost  just north of the equator.

The sovereign island nation's capital is Palikir, located on Pohnpei Island, while the largest city is Weno, located in the Chuuk Atoll.

Each of its four states is centered on one or more main high islands, and all but Kosrae include numerous outlying atolls. The Federated States of Micronesia is spread across part of the Caroline Islands in the wider region of Micronesia, which consists of thousands of small islands divided among several countries. The term Micronesia may refer to the Federated States or to the region as a whole.

The FSM was formerly a part of the Trust Territory of the Pacific Islands (TTPI), a United Nations Trust Territory under U.S. administration, but it formed its own constitutional government on May 10, 1979, becoming a sovereign state after independence was attained on November 3, 1986, under a Compact of Free Association with the United States. Other neighboring island entities, and also former members of the TTPI, formulated their own constitutional governments and became the Republic of the Marshall Islands (RMI) and the Republic of Palau (ROP). The FSM has a seat in the United Nations and has been a member of the Pacific Community since 1983.

History 

The ancestors of the Micronesians settled over four thousand years ago. A decentralized chieftain-based system eventually evolved into a more centralized economic and religious culture centered on Yap Island.

Nan Madol, a UNESCO World Heritage Site, consisting of a series of small artificial islands linked by a network of canals, is often called the Venice of the Pacific. It is located on the eastern periphery of the island of Pohnpei and used to be the ceremonial and political seat of the Saudeleur dynasty that united Pohnpei's estimated 25,000 people from about AD 500 until 1500, when the centralized system collapsed.

European explorers—first the Portuguese in search of the Spice Islands (Indonesia) and then the Spanish—reached the Carolines in the sixteenth century. The Treaty of Tordesillas gave these lands to Spain and the Spanish incorporated the archipelago to the Spanish East Indies through the capital, Manila, and in the 19th century established a number of outposts and missions. In 1887, they founded the town of Santiago de la Ascensión in what today is Kolonia on the island of Pohnpei.

In the 1870s, Germany began extending its sphere of influence in the Caroline Islands, leading to the Carolines Question of 1885 in which Pope Leo XIII was asked to determine if Germany or Spain had authority over the islands. The result was a confirmation of Spanish authority over the islands, but Germany would have free access to the islands.

Following defeat in the Spanish–American War, the Spanish sold the archipelago to Germany in 1899 under the German–Spanish Treaty of 1899. Germany incorporated it into German New Guinea. (A few remote islands, notably Kapingamarangi, were not specifically named in the treaty, but this remained unnoticed until the late 1940s and, while acknowledging the historical curiosity in 1949, Spain has made no modern claims to the islands.)

During World War I, it was captured by Japan. Following the war, the League of Nations awarded a mandate for Japan to administer the islands as part of the South Seas Mandate.

During World War II, a significant portion of the Japanese fleet was based in Truk Lagoon. In February 1944, Operation Hailstone, one of the most important naval battles of the war, took place at Truk, in which many Japanese support vessels and aircraft were destroyed.

Following World War II, it was administered by the United States under United Nations auspices in 1947 as part of the Trust Territory of the Pacific Islands pursuant to Security Council Resolution 21.

On May 10, 1979, four of the Trust Territory districts ratified a new constitution to become the Federated States of Micronesia. Palau, the Marshall Islands, and the Northern Mariana Islands chose not to participate. The FSM signed a Compact of Free Association with the United States, which entered into force on November 3, 1986, marking Micronesia's emergence from trusteeship to independence. Independence was formally concluded under international law in 1990, when the United Nations officially ended the Trusteeship status pursuant to Security Council Resolution 683. The Compact was renewed in 2004.

On June 22, 2015, the Federated States of Micronesia established the world's second-largest regional shark sanctuary in the country's exclusive economic zone covering nearly 3 million sq kilometers of western sea.

Politics

The Federated States of Micronesia is governed by the 1979 constitution, which guarantees fundamental human rights and establishes a separation of governmental powers. This constitution constructs the national government to be similar to – but not exactly alike – that of the United States. The unicameral Congress has fourteen members elected by popular vote. Four senators—one from each state—serve four-year terms; the remaining ten senators represent single-member districts based on population and serve two-year terms. Congress elects the President and Vice President from among the four state-based senators to serve four-year terms in the executive branch. Their congressional seats are then filled by special elections.

An appointed cabinet supports the president and vice president. There are no formal political parties.

Defense and foreign affairs

In international politics, the Federated States of Micronesia has often voted with the United States with respect to United Nations General Assembly resolutions.

The FSM is a sovereign, self-governing state in free association with the United States of America, which is wholly responsible for its defense. The FSM National Police operates a Maritime Wing Unit. The Compact of Free Association allows FSM citizens to join the U.S. military without having to obtain U.S. permanent residency or citizenship, allows for immigration and employment for Micronesians in the U.S., and establishes economic and technical aid programs.

FSM has foreign relations with 56 countries, including the Holy See and the Sovereign Military Order of Malta. FSM was admitted to the United Nations based on the Security Council's recommendation on August 9, 1991 in Resolution 703 and the General Assembly's approval on September 17, 1991 in Resolution 46/2. The FSM was an active member of the Pacific Islands Forum. However, in February 2021, FSM announced it would be formally withdrawing from the Forum in a joint statement with Marshall Islands, Kiribati and Nauru after a dispute regarding Henry Puna's election as the Forum's secretary-general.

Administrative divisions

The four states in the federation are, from west to east:

These states are further divided into municipalities.

Geography

The islands are grouped into four states, which are Yap, Chuuk (called Truk until January 1990), Pohnpei (known as "Ponape" until November 1984), and Kosrae (formerly Kusaie). These four states are each represented by a white star on the national flag. The capital is Palikir, on Pohnpei.

Two terrestrial ecoregions lie within the country's borders: Carolines tropical moist forests and Yap tropical dry forests. It had a 2019 Forest Landscape Integrity Index mean score of 7.55/10, ranking it 37th globally out of 172 countries.

Biodiversity 
The major coastal communities are mangrove forests, seagrass beds, lagoons and coral reefs, biologically and physically linked. About 300 species of coral, 1000 species of fish and 1200 species of mollusks are recognized in Micronesia. In the mangrove forests there are shrimps, crabs and fish, as well as birds that feed on them. Seagrass meadows appear offshore following the mangroves. The lagoons provide food for the reef inhabitants and contain various kinds of plankton. The biodiversity and complexity of the coral reefs increases markedly from east to west, with 150 species of hard coral at Kosrae, 200 at Pohnpei and 300 at Chuuk. Coral productivity in this area is among the highest in the world, absorbing about 2500 grams of carbon per square meter per year, against 2200 grams in the tropical forest and 125 grams in the open sea.

Inland, from the tidal zone to the top of the mountains there is a varied range of vegetation, cloud forest, upland, palm, plantation, areas dominated by climbers of the genus Merremia, savannas, native secondary forest, fragments of introduced trees, cultivated areas, freshwater swamps, swamps of the palm Nypa fruticans, atoll forests, forests in rocky areas and beaches. There are about 1230 species of ferns and flowering plants, of which 782 are native, including 145 native fern species. On Pohnpei Island, there are about 750 plant species, of which 110 are endemic. Another 457 species have been introduced.

Climate 

The Federated States of Micronesia has a tropical rainforest climate (Köppen: Af). The weather is warm, humid and rainy all year round. The islands are located north of the equator and are affected by constant trade winds, which temper the climate. Minimum temperatures range all year round between 22 and 25°C, and maximum temperatures between 30 and 32°C. The abundant precipitations oscillate between 2500 and 5000 mm per year, although in the faces oriented to the wind they can surpass 6000 mm. Mount Nahnalaud, only 750 m high, on the island of Pohnpei, receives an average of 10,160 mm, being one of the rainiest places on earth, with almost always overcast skies. In general, the rains are produced by showers and storms of short duration but very intense. The driest places are the flat atolls, where rainfall can drop below 3000 mm. The driest months are January and February, with no less than 250 mm and 20 days of rain.

Transportation
The Federated States of Micronesia is served by four international airports.
 Pohnpei International Airport, on the main island of Pohnpei State.
 Chuuk International Airport, located on the main island of Chuuk State.
 Kosrae International Airport, located on the main island of Kosrae State.
 Yap International Airport, located on the main island of Yap State.

Economy

Economic activity in the Federated States of Micronesia consists primarily of subsistence farming and fishing. The islands have few mineral deposits worth exploiting, except for high-grade phosphate. Long line fishing of tuna is also viable with foreign vessels from China that operated in the 1990s. The potential for a tourist industry exists, but the remoteness of the location and a lack of adequate facilities hinder development. Financial assistance from the U.S. is the primary source of revenue, with the U.S. pledged to spend $1.3 billion in the islands in 1986–2001; when the Compact was amended in 2004, the United States committed to providing $110 million in development aid through 2023. The CIA World Factbook lists high dependence on U.S. aid as one of the main concerns of the FSM. Geographical isolation and a poorly developed infrastructure are major impediments to long-term growth.

Society

Demographics

The indigenous population of the nation, which is predominantly Micronesian, consists of various ethnolinguistic groups. It has a nearly 100% Pacific Islander and Asian population: Chuukese 48.8%, Pohnpeian 24.2%, Kosraean 6.2%, Yapese 5.2%, Yap outer islands 4.5%, Asian 1.8%, Polynesian 1.5%, other 6.4%, unknown 1.4%. A sizable minority also have some Japanese ancestry, which is a result of intermarriages between Japanese settlers and Micronesians during the Japanese colonial period.

There is also a growing expatriate population of Americans, Australians, Europeans, and residents from China and the Philippines since the 1990s. English has become the common language of the government, and for secondary and tertiary education. Outside of the main capital towns of the four FSM states, the local languages are primarily spoken. In the Catholic mission of Pohnpei, among the Mercedarian missionaries, considered an institution in the country, Spanish is also spoken. Growth remains high at more than 3% annually, offset somewhat by net emigration.

Languages

English is the official and common language. Aside from English, the following Austronesian languages are spoken:

Religion

The Federated States of Micronesia are 97% Christian. More than half of the population follows the Catholic Church (55%) and about 42% follow various Protestant Christian groups. In general this is due to Spanish and German colonial history. Spanish rule meant that a large part of the population remained Catholic. During the German colonial period, until 1914, Catholic and Protestant missionaries from the German Empire were deployed.Several Protestant denominations, as well as the Roman Catholic Church, are present in every Micronesian state. Most Protestant groups trace their roots to American Congregationalist missionaries. On the island of Kosrae, the population is approximately 7,800; 95 percent are Protestants. On Pohnpei, the population of 35,000 is evenly divided between Protestants and Catholics. Most immigrants are Filipino Catholics who have joined local Catholic churches, e.g. Our Lady of Mercy Catholic Church in Pohnpei.

On Chuuk and Yap, an estimated 60 percent are Catholic and 40 percent are Protestant. Religious groups with small followings include Baptists, Assemblies of God, Salvation Army, Seventh-day Adventists, Jehovah's Witnesses, The Church of Jesus Christ of Latter-day Saints (Mormons), and the Baháʼí Faith. There is a small group of Buddhists on Pohnpei, and a small group of Ahmadiyya Muslims in both Pohnpei and Kosrae. Attendance at religious services is generally high; churches are well supported by their congregations and play a significant role in civil society.

In the 1890s, on the island of Pohnpei, intermissionary conflicts and the conversion of clan leaders resulted in religious divisions along clan lines which persist today. More Protestants live on the western side of the island, while more Catholics live on the eastern side. Missionaries of many religious traditions are present and operate freely. The Constitution provides for freedom of religion, and the Government generally respects this right in practice. The US government received no reports of societal abuses or discrimination based on religious belief or practice in 2007.

Health 

Life expectancy was 66 for men and 69 for women in 2018.

Pingelap in Pohnpei State is notable for the prevalence of an extreme form of color blindness called Achromatopsia, and known locally as maskun. Approximately 5% of the atoll's 3000 inhabitants are afflicted.

Sport

Baseball

Baseball is very popular in the FSM.

Association football
The sport of association football in the Federated States of Micronesia is run by the Federated States of Micronesia Football Association. They control the Micronesian Games, the nation's football championship and the Micronesia national football team.

FSMAA
The Federated States of Micronesia Athletic Association is the governing body for the country's sports and athletics.

Culture

Each of the four states has its own culture and traditions, but there are also common cultural and economic bonds that are centuries old. Cultural similarities include the importance of the traditional extended family and clan systems and are found on all the islands.

The islanders, aware of the owner of a piece, do not necessarily move them when ownership changes. There are five major types: Mmbul, Gaw, Ray, Yar, and Reng, the last being only  in diameter. Their value is based on both size and history, many of them having been brought from other islands, as far as New Guinea, but most coming in ancient times from Palau. Approximately 6,500 of them are scattered around the island.

Pohnpei is home to Nan Madol: Ceremonial Centre of Eastern Micronesia, a UNESCO World Heritage Site, but the site is currently listed as In Danger due to natural causes. The government is working on the conservation of the site.

Music

Traditional dances on the main islands includes "stick dancing" on Pohnpei, Chuuk and Yap, standing dances on Chuuk and sitting dances on Yap and Chuuk. The Yapese are particularly known for their skills in dancing. The Yapese stick dance is performed by men, women and children together, while standing dances are performed either by women or men and boys, but never both together. The men participate in various dancing competitions, which are segregated by caste; the lower castes have some distinct dances, such as a woman's standing dance, but can only dance when authorized by a person of a higher caste.

Newspapers
The following papers have been published in the FSM:
 Pohnpei
 The Kaselehlie Press — from 2001. English. Published biweekly.
 Senyavin Times — from 1967 to the 1970s. Bilingual (Pohnpeian and English).
 Chuuk
 Truk Chronicle — from 1979 to the 1980s. Published biweekly in English, with some articles in Carolinian.
 Kosrae
 Kosrae State Newsletter — from 1983 to 2004. Published monthly in Kosraean.
 Yap
 The Yap Networker — from 1999 to 2005. Published weekly in English.

Literature
There have been very few published literary writers from the Federated States of Micronesia. In 2008, Emelihter Kihleng became the first ever Micronesian to publish a collection of poetry in the English language.

See also

 Outline of the Federated States of Micronesia
 Index of Federated States of Micronesia–related articles

References

Sources

External links

Government
 Government of the Federated States of Micronesia
 Chief of State and Cabinet Members

General information
 Federated States of Micronesia. The World Factbook. Central Intelligence Agency.
 Federated States of Micronesia from UCB Libraries GovPubs
 
 Micronesia from the BBC News
 Jane's Federated States of Micronesia Home Page 
 Trust Territory of the Pacific Archives at the University of Hawaii
 Pacific Islands Legal Information Institute - Federated States of Micronesia
 Nature.org - Micronesia environmental conservation
 myMicronesia.com Online resource center about the islands of Micronesia. Provides free listings and links to all Micronesian businesses, as well as civic, cultural, health and educational organizations.
 Habele.org - Outer Islands Information about the remote islands and atolls outside the four state capitals of Micronesia from an educational nonprofit.
 Development Forecasts for Federated States of Micronesia

News media
 The Kaselehlie Press  – The Kaselehlie Press is a Pohnpei-based newspaper that covers stories throughout the FSM.
 Pohnpei (Spanish)

Maps
 
 Nan Madol islet complex Provides computer based reconstruction of the main islets and features

Travel
 Travel Overview of Micronesia
 Yap Visitors Bureau

Weather
 NOAA's National Weather Service - Chuuk, FSM
 NOAA's National Weather Service - Pohnpei & Kosrae, FSM
 NOAA's National Weather Service - Yap, FSM

 
1986 establishments in Oceania
Associated states of the United States
Federated States of Micronesia
Federated States of Micronesia
Countries in Oceania
English-speaking countries and territories
Federal constitutional republics
Former German colonies
Former Japanese colonies
Former Spanish colonies
Island countries
Member states of the United Nations
Small Island Developing States
Spanish East Indies
Federated States of Micronesia